This partial list of city nicknames in Georgia compiles the aliases, sobriquets and slogans that cities in Georgia are known by (or have been known by historically), officially and unofficially, to municipal governments, local people, outsiders or their tourism boards or chambers of commerce. City nicknames can help in establishing a civic identity, helping outsiders recognize a community or attracting people to a community because of its nickname; promote civic pride; and build community unity. Nicknames and slogans that successfully create a new community "ideology or myth" are also believed to have economic value. Their economic value is difficult to measure, but there are anecdotal reports of cities that have achieved substantial economic benefits by "branding" themselves by adopting new slogans.

Some unofficial nicknames are positive, while others are derisive. The unofficial nicknames listed here have been in use for a long time or have gained wide currency.

Nicknames by city
 
Abbeville – Wild Hog Capital of Georgia
Albany – The Good Life City
Alpharetta – Awesome Alpharetta!
Ashburn – Peanut Capital of the World
Athens – The Classic City
Atlanta 
Augusta  – The Garden City of the South
Blakely – Peanut Capital of the World
Canon – The Big Gun
Canton – Film Capital of North Georgia
Carrollton – City of Dreams
Claxton – Fruitcake Capital of the World
Colquitt – Mayhaw Capital of the World
Columbus
The Lowell of the South
The Fountain City
Cordele – Watermelon Capital of the World
Dalton – Carpet Capital of the World
Darien – Hidden Gem of the Golden Isles
Dawson – Spanish Peanut Capital of the World
Decatur – People's Republic of Decatur
Dublin – The Emerald City
Elberton – The Granite City
Ellijay – Georgia's Apple Capital
Fort Valley – Peach Capital of Georgia
Gainesville – Poultry Capital of the World
Griffin – Iris City
LaGrange – The Greatest Little City
Lithonia – City of Granite
Macon
The Central City
Cherry Blossom Capital of the World
Maconga
Metter – Everything's Better in Metter
Milledgeville – Old Capitol City
Nashville – City of Dogwoods
Newnan – City of Homes
Peachtree City - The Bubble
Powder Springs – P-Town
Quitman – The Camellia City
Sandersville – Kaolin Capital of the World
Savannah
America's Most Haunted City
Turf Grass Capital of the World
Swainsboro  – Crossroads of the Great South
Sylvester –  Peanut Capital of the World
Thomasville – City of Roses
Thomson 
Camellia City of the South
Tournament City
Tifton – The Friendly City
Valdosta
The Azalea City
Winnersville U.S.A.
Vidalia – Sweet Onion Capital of the World
Warner Robins – Georgia's International City
Warwick – The Grits Capital of Georgia or The Grits Capital of the World
Waynesboro – Bird Dog Capital of the World

See also
List of municipalities in Georgia (U.S. state)
List of city nicknames in the United States

References

Georgia cities and towns
Nicknames
City nicknames